The 1929–30 New York Americans season was the fifth season of play of the Americans. After making the playoffs in 1929, the team slid to last-place in the Canadian Division and did not qualify for the playoffs.

Offseason
Tommy Gorman left the Americans for a position in managing the Agua Caliente Racetrack. Lionel Conacher became the playing-coach and general manager.

Regular season
The season started poorly for the Amerks, winning only two games by Christmas, and by then out of the playoff race and ten games under .500. The team only won back-to-back games three times and the highlight was a modest three-game win streak in March. The team would finish eleven games under .500 for the season.

Final standings

Record vs. opponents

Game log

Playoffs
The Americans did not qualify for the playoffs.

Player stats

Regular season
Scoring

Goaltending

Playoffs
The Americans did not qualify for the playoffs.

Awards and records

Transactions

See also
1929–30 NHL season

References

New York
New York
New York Americans seasons
New York Amer
New York Amer
1920s in Manhattan
1930s in Manhattan
Madison Square Garden